Halbi bin Mohammad Yussof; born , is a Bruneian politician who currently serves as a Minister at the Prime Minister's Office and Minister of Defence II.  He is a former member of the Legislative Council of Brunei, and previously served as the Minister of Defence II from 2018 to 2022, Minister of Culture, Youth and Sports from 2015 to 2018, Commander of the Royal Brunei Armed Forces (RBAF), and Royal Brunei Land Forces (RBLF).

Biography

Early life

Military career

On , Halbi enlisted in the Royal Brunei Armed Forces (RBAF) (ABDB), then known as the Royal Brunei Malay Regiment (RBMR) (AMDB).  Following completion of six months basic training, on 6 February 1976, Halbi became an Officer Cadet whilst attending the Royal Military Academy Sandhurst, England, in the United Kingdom.  On 7 April 1977, he graduated from the Standard Military Course No 13 at Sandhurst, and was commissioned as a Second Lieutenant.

From 1 February 2001 to 14 March 2003, Brigadier General Halbi became the fourth commander of the Royal Brunei Land Forces (RBLF).  In 2004, he overseen the Brunei Defence White Paper, along with its update in 2007.  On 8 January 2005, he received a farewell call from Malaysian Chief of Defence Forces, Mohd Anwar Mohd Nor, and discussed on improving the relations of both countries via bilateral military relationships.  Him alongside Yasmin Umar and Abdul Halim Mohd Yussof visited recently arrived RSS Steadfast (70) at Muara Naval Base during the opening ceremony of Exercise Pelican on 3 June 2008.  After that on 10 November 2009, Major General Halbi made his last visit to Singapore, which was concluded with a meeting with Desmond Kuek and inspection of the Guard of Honour.  The handover ceremony between Halbi and Aminuddin Ihsan was held at Tutong Camp, Tutong on 31 December 2009.

Military courses
Halbi has attended the following military training courses and staff colleges:
Royal Military Academy Sandhurst, England, United Kingdom – initial officer training, Standard Military Course No 13, 6 February 1976 to 7 April 1977;
Platoon Commanders' Battle Cadre, United Kingdom, 1982;
Manpower and Security Officers' Course, Singapore, 1984;
Junior Staff Course, Malaysia, 1985;
Overseas Joint Warfare, Australian Defence College, Australia, 1987;
All Arms Tactic Course, United Kingdom, 1987;
Command and Staff College, Quetta, Pakistan, 1989;
Royal College of Defence Studies, Seaford House, London, England, 2000.

Ranks and promotions

Halbi was promoted to the following ranks during his military service in the Royal Brunei Armed Forces (RBAF):
Second Lieutenant (2nd Lt), 
Brigadier General (Brg Gen)
Major General (Maj Gen),

Appointments and commands
During his military service, Halbi has held the following commands or offices of appointment within the, or relating to Royal Brunei Armed Forces (RBAF):
Military Assistant to the Commander of the Royal Brunei Armed Forces
Commanding Officer of 2nd Battalion Royal Brunei Land Forces (RBLF)
Staff Officer Grade 1 (SO1) Operations Directorate of Operations and Plans
Acting Director Minister of Defence Office / Directorate of Strategic Planning
4th Commander Royal Brunei Land Forces, 1 February 2001 to 14 March 2003
7th Commander Royal Brunei Armed Forces, 28 March 2003.

Political career
In 2010, Halbi was appointed as Brunei's High Commissioner to Malaysia.  On 30 May 2015, he was appointed as the Deputy Minister at the Ministry of Home Affairs, which he would hold until 21 October 2015, in which he would be reappointed to Minister of Culture, Youth and Sports.  On 18 November 2015, Minister Halbi met with Khairy Jamaluddin during the ASEAN+ Young Leaders Summit in order to tighten relationship between Brunei and Malaysia alongside find ways to improve youth development and sports in both countries.  During an official televised announcement by the Sultan on 30 January 2018, it became known that Halbi had been appointed as the Second Minister in the Ministry of Defence.

In response to the 2017–2018 North Korea crisis on 11 February 2018, Minister Halbi and Erywan Yusof agreed with Taro Kono to apply pressure on North Korea, including the implementation of United Nations Security Council Resolutions during the 45th Year of ASEAN-Japan Friendship and Cooperation.  Later on 14 August, he made an introductory visit to Singapore, meeting with Ng Eng Hen in the aim to strengthen the relationships of Brunei and Singapore.  The 16th International Monitoring Team (IMT) in Mindanao was greeted by Minister Halbi at Ninoy Aquino International Airport, during his visit to Manila on 30 August 2019.

In June 2022, during the national cabinet reshuffle televised by the Sultan, Halbi was appointed as the newly incumbent Minister at the Prime Minister's Office.  Japan's Defense Minister Nobuo Kishi congratulated Halbi on his newly appointed position, followed up by raising concerns on regional security, the issues caused by the 2022 Russian invasion of Ukraine in international order, and strengthening of relationships between the two nations militarily on 21 June 2022.  As the acting Minister of Health on 25 July, he noted the downward trend in COVID-19 cases in Brunei.

Honours

National

 Order of Seri Paduka Mahkota Brunei Third Class (SMB), 1986
 Order of Paduka Keberanian Laila Terbilang First Class (DPKT) – Dato Paduka Seri, 15 July 2003
 Sultan Hassanal Bolkiah Medal (PHBS)
 Silver Jubilee Medal, 5 October 1992
 Royal Brunei Armed Forces Silver Jubilee Medal, 31 May 1986
 General Service Medal
 Long Service Medal (Armed Forces)
 Proclamation of Independence Medal, 1 January 1984

Foreign
:
 Bintang Yudha Dharma Utama (BYD), 20 December 2004
Marine Corps Honorary Member of the Indonesian National Armed Forces - Navy, 21 December 2004
Honorary Pilot Wing (First Class) and Honorary Member of The Special Unit Corps, (Korpaskhas) Air Force of Indonesia's Armed Forces, 9 November 2006
:
 Grand Cordon of the Order of Independence, 13 May 2008
:
 Order of Military Service Courageous Commander (PGAT), 23 November 2004
10th Para Brigade Malaysian Army Airborne Wing (Honorary Member of the elite force), 7 September 2007
:
 Hilal e-Imtiaz (Military), 28 June 2006
Command and Staff College (Quetta-Pakistan) Centenary Medal, 2006
:
 Philippine Legion of Honor Commander (CLH), 24 May 2006
Combat Commander's Kagitingan Badge - Philippine Army, 27 Nov 2009
Philippine Navy Command at Sea Badge - Philippine Navy, 27 Nov 2009
PAF Gold Wing Badge - Philippine Air Force, 27 Nov 2009
:
 Pingat Jasa Gemilang (PJG)
 Darjah Utama Bakti Cemerlang (DUBC), November 2004
:
 Order of the Crown of Thailand First Class (PM (GCCT)), 27 July 2009

References

1956 births
Living people
Government ministers of Brunei
Members of the Legislative Council of Brunei
Bruneian military leaders
Graduates of the Royal Military Academy Sandhurst
Graduates of the Royal College of Defence Studies
Grand Cordons of the Order of Independence (Jordan)
Recipients of the Philippine Legion of Honor
Recipients of Hilal-i-Imtiaz
High Commissioners of Brunei to Malaysia